"Alone" is a song by musical group the Bee Gees. The ballad, written by Barry, Robin, and Maurice Gibb, is the opening track on their 21st studio album, Still Waters (1997), and was the first single released from the album on 17 February 1997. In the United Kingdom, the song was backed with two B-sides: "Closer Than Close" and "Rings Around the Moon", while in the United States, a live version of "Stayin' Alive" was included on the single releases.

The track was a worldwide hit, peaking at number five in the United Kingdom and number two in New Zealand, where it was the 10th-highest-selling single of 1997. In Canada, it reached number 20 and was the most successful adult contemporary song of 1997 according to RPM magazine. On the US Billboard Hot 100, the single peaked at number 28, making it the Bee Gees' 30th and final top-40 hit in the US, after being a Billboard "Hot Shot" debut at number 34.

Song information
Maurice Gibb explained about the track:

Barry and Robin Gibb alternate on lead vocals on the track, with both mostly using the group's trademark falsetto.

Critical reception
British magazine Music Week rated the song four out of five, adding, "Brits lifetime award-winners should crashland in the top five with their instantly-familiar harmonies and Barry Gibb's sure pop production (cod bagpipes over an ELO-style arrangement this time)."

Music video
Two promotional videos directed by Nick Egan were made for the song. The first one, not shown in the United States, featured the brothers singing in a spinning room intercut with a female astronaut slowly removing her space suit in zero gravity, a homage to the opening of the 1968 sci-fi cult film Barbarella. The promo for the US featured the brothers recording the song in a studio, intercut with various clips of the brothers throughout the years, as well as segments of the original video.

Track listings

 UK CD1 and Australian CD single
 "Alone" – 4:49
 "Closer Than Close" – 4:34
 "Rings Around the Moon" – 4:29

 UK CD2
 "Alone" – 4:49
 "How Deep Is Your Love" – 4:02
 "Words" – 3:13
 "I've Gotta Get a Message to You" – 3:06

 UK cassette single and European CD single
 "Alone" – 4:49
 "Closer Than Close" – 4:34

 US CD single
 "Alone" (single mix) – 4:02
 "Stayin' Alive" (live) – 4:06
 "You Should Be Dancing" (Decadance) – 8:42
 "Rings Around the Moon" – 4:29

 US cassette single
A. "Alone" (single mix) – 4:20
B. "Stayin' Alive" (live) – 4:06

Charts

Weekly charts

Year-end charts

Certifications

Release history

Cover versions
"Alone" was covered by American country music artist Monty Holmes on his 1998 debut album, All I Ever Wanted. It was released as the album's second single and peaked at number 53 on the Billboard Hot Country Singles & Tracks chart.

References

1990s ballads
1996 songs
1997 singles
1998 singles
Bee Gees songs
Monty Holmes songs
Polydor Records singles
Song recordings produced by Russ Titelman
Songs written by Barry Gibb
Songs written by Maurice Gibb
Songs written by Robin Gibb